The 1909–10 Scottish Division One season was won by Celtic by two points over nearest rival Falkirk.

League table

Results

References

Scottish Football Archive

1909–10 Scottish Football League
Scottish Division One seasons
Scottish